Begell House is a STM academic publisher of medical and scientific journals and books, with a concentration on engineering and biomedical sciences. The publisher is also producing eBooks and digital articles via "Begell Digital Library" and "Thermopedia" The company is privately owned. It headquarters are in Danbury, Connecticut. It was founded in 1991 by William Begell.

Journals

It currently publishes 48 peer-reviewed journals and about 10 new books annually. All journals are peer-reviewed for academic and professional communities. Begell House's entire collection of 38 e-journals are archived and preserved electronically by Portico. 

All journal titles are included in Journal Citation Reports. Begell House Journals are indexed by major indexing and abstracting services, including ISI Thompson Science Citation Index, CAS, SCOPUS, PubMed, CrossRef, and others.

References

External links 
 

 
Publishing companies of the United States
Publishing companies established in 1991
1991 establishments in New York (state)